Michael C. Delaney (November 20, 1849 – January 20, 1918) was a merchant and politician.

Life
He was born in Malpeque, Prince Edward Island, the son of John Delaney and Mary Quigley. Delaney sold agricultural products; his two sons later joined him in the business. In 1871, he married Altimira Jane Robinson. Delaney was an unsuccessful candidate for a seat in the provincial assembly in 1904 and 1908. He was first elected to the provincial assembly in a 1909 by-election held after Joseph Read was unseated (or resigned his seat, according to some sources). He was defeated when he ran for reelection in 1915.

References
 

Progressive Conservative Party of Prince Edward Island MLAs
1849 births
1918 deaths